Gorbachev: His Life and Times is a 2017 biography of Mikhail Gorbachev by William Taubman.

See also 
 Khrushchev: The Man and His Era

References 

Biographies (books)
Mikhail Gorbachev